Mama Womb Womb is the second album by God Bullies, released in 1989 through Amphetamine Reptile Records.

Track listing

Personnel 
God Bullies
Adam Berg – drums, percussion
Mike Corso – bass guitar
Mike Hard – vocals
David B. Livingstone – guitar, keyboards, engineering, mixing
Production and additional personnel
Sue Moulds – backing vocals

References

External links 
 

1989 albums
Amphetamine Reptile Records albums
God Bullies albums